Marina Vishmidt (born 1976) is an American writer, editor and critic. She lectures at the Centre for Cultural Studies at Goldsmiths, University of London in the MA program Culture Industry, and teaches Art Theory in the MA Art Praxis at the Dutch Art Institute in Arnhem. Her research mainly concerns the relationship between art, value and labour. She further explores this through works on debt, social reproduction and artistic entrepreneurialism. In 2013, she completed her PhD entitled 'Speculation as a Mode of Production in Art and Capital' at the Queen Mary University of London.

Writing 
Vishmidt has written and edited several publications including Speculation as a Mode of Production (Brill, 2018), Reproducing Autonomy: Work, Money, Crisis and Contemporary Art (2016) together with Kerstin Stakemeier and Media Mutandis (2006) written together with Mary Anne Francis, Jo Walsh and Lewis Sykes.

Vishmidt contributed to various publications, such as the Exhibition catalogue for Grace Schwindt's exhibition Run a Home, Build a Town, Lead a Revolution. An Exhibition in Three Acts (1362), at MARCO - Museum of Contemporary Art, Vigo, and The Grand Domestic Revolution GOES ON  published by Casco, Utrecht in 2010. She authored several chapters in the Routledge Companion to Art and Politics which discusses the complex relationship between art and politics and was published in 2015.

She is also a frequent contributor to various journals, including Afterall, Texte zur Kunst and E-flux.

Collaborations 
Vishmidt frequently collaborates with various artists and activists. In 2010, she contributed texts to the 4th instalment of the project Lying Freely by artist Ruth Buchanan which took the form of a book.

She was also part of a longterm research group of artists, writers, architects and musicians who worked together on the historical and contemporary presentation, documentation and reception of Victory over the Sun a Russian Futurist opera that premiered in 1913 in Saint Petersburg. The collective research efforts have been gathered in the publication Anfang Gut, Alles Gut - Actualizations of the Futurist Opera Victory Over the Sun 1913.

Vishmidt is part of the working group of Cinenova a London-based feminist film and video distributor. She also collaborated with the Full Unemployment Cinema, a collective which screened films in independent, self-organised venues around London. The films focus mostly on themes of work, non-work, refusal and struggle.

References

1976 births
Living people
Ukrainian women writers
Ukrainian art critics
American art educators
Academics of Goldsmiths, University of London